Minas Hadjimichael (born 1956) is the former Permanent Representative to the United Nations for Cyprus.  He presented his credentials to UN Secretary-General Ban Ki-moon on 25 August 2008.

Education
Hadjimichael holds a bachelor of laws degree from the University of Athens and a masters of arts in political science and international relations, which he received at Georgia Southern University in the United States.  He has also received instruction in European Union concerns from the Civil Service College of London, and was a participant in a program hosted by the United States Information Agency (USIA) on the United States Federal Government System.  In addition to his academic credentials, Hadjimichael also speaks Greek, English and French.

Career
Hadmichael was Director of the Cyprus Question and European Union-Turkey Affairs Division of the Cyprus Ministry of Foreign Affairs, and served as the Ministry's Acting Permanent Secretary, prior to his taking office at the United Nations.  His long diplomatic service includes postings as Cyprus' Ambassador to France, Tunisia, Andorra, and Algeria.  He has served in Cyprus' European Union Division as Deputy Director. He has also served as Deputy Chief of Mission at the Cyprus Embassy in Athens, Greece and Director of the Cypriot Foreign Minister's Cabinet.

See also

List of Permanent Representatives to the UN

References
Notes

Sources
United Nation Press Release Presentation of Credentials: Hadjimichael

External links
 Cyprus to the United Nations

1956 births
Living people
Cypriot diplomats
Permanent Representatives of Cyprus to the United Nations
Ambassadors of Cyprus to France
Ambassadors of Cyprus to Tunisia
Ambassadors of Cyprus to Andorra
Ambassadors of Cyprus to Algeria